The 2013 Open 13 was a men's tennis tournament played on indoor hard courts. It was the 20th edition of the Open 13, and part of the ATP World Tour 250 series of the 2013 ATP World Tour. It took place at the Palais des Sports in Marseille, France, from 18 February through 24 February 2013. Third-seeded Jo-Wilfried Tsonga won the singles title.

Singles main-draw entrants

Seeds 

 Rankings are as of February 11, 2013.

Other entrants 
The following players received wildcards into the singles main draw:
  Ernests Gulbis
  Gaël Monfils
  Lucas Pouille

The following players received entry from the qualifying draw:
  Filip Krajinović
  Édouard Roger-Vasselin
  Sergiy Stakhovsky
  Dmitry Tursunov

Withdrawals 
Before the tournament
  Victor Hănescu
  Tatsuma Ito
  Łukasz Kubot
  Paul-Henri Mathieu
  Radek Štěpánek
  Grega Žemlja

Doubles main-draw entrants

Seeds 

 Rankings are as of February 11, 2013.

Other entrants 
The following pairs received wildcards into the doubles main draw:
  Maxime Chazal /  Martin Vaïsse
  David Guez /  Josselin Ouanna

Finals

Singles 

  Jo-Wilfried Tsonga defeated  Tomáš Berdych, 3–6, 7–6(8–6), 6–4

Doubles 

 Rohan Bopanna /  Colin Fleming defeated  Aisam-ul-Haq Qureshi /  Jean-Julien Rojer, 6–4, 7–6(7–3)

References

External links 
Official website

Open 13
Open 13